Walter Joseph Buczynski (born 17 December 1933) is a Canadian composer, music educator, and pianist.

Born in Toronto, Ontario, Buczynski earned an associate degree from The Royal Conservatory of Music in 1951 and a Licentiate in 1953. While there he studied music composition with Godfrey Ridout and piano with Earle Moss. He studied under Darius Milhaud and Charles Jones at the Aspen Music Festival and School in 1955. He pursued further studies in piano with Rosina Lhévinne in New York City in 1958–1959. He won a number of grants from the Government of Poland which enabled him to study music composition with Zbigniew Drzewiecki in Warsaw in 1959 and 1961. Likewise, grants from the Canada Council made it possible for him to study under Nadia Boulanger in Paris in 1960 and 1962.

In 1951 and 1952 Buczynski was awarded second prizes at the Composers, Authors and Publishers Association of Canada composition competition, going on to win first prize there in 1954 with a piano trio. In 1955 he won the Fromm Foundation Award with the Suite for Woodwind Quintet. That same year he made his debut as a concert pianist with the Toronto Symphony Orchestra playing Frédéric Chopin's Piano Concerto No. 2 in F minor.

Buczynski went on to have an active concert career during the 1960s and early 1970s, giving recitals in major concert venues throughout Canada and in New York City, Paris, and Warsaw. His concerts often featured his own work and pieces by other contemporary Canadian composers in addition to traditional repertoire. He made several appearances on CBC Radio as well and made a number of solo recordings. In 1977 he decided to drastically limit his performance schedule to focus on his teaching career and composition work. Of the few concerts he gave later, his 23 September 1982 Toronto recital was particularly notable as he played only his music.

In 1962 Buczynski joined the piano and music theory faculty at The Royal Conservatory of Music. He left there in 1969 to teach on the faculty of the University of Toronto, where he taught piano and composition until his retirement in 1999. Among his notable pupils were composers John Burge and Timothy Sullivan. He served as the president of the Canadian League of Composers in 1974–1975. On 18 December 1983 a special concert honoring his 50th birthday was given by the Canadian Broadcasting Corporation and the University of Toronto Faculty of Music.

References

External links

 Archival papers and manuscripts at University of Toronto Music Library

1933 births
Living people
20th-century classical composers
Aspen Music Festival and School alumni
Canadian classical composers
Canadian classical pianists
Male classical pianists
Canadian opera composers
Musicians from Toronto
The Royal Conservatory of Music alumni
Academic staff of The Royal Conservatory of Music
Academic staff of the University of Toronto
Pupils of Darius Milhaud